The William Lowell Putnam Mathematical Competition, often abbreviated to Putnam Competition, is an annual mathematics competition for undergraduate college students enrolled at institutions of higher learning in the United States and Canada (regardless of the students' nationalities). It awards a scholarship and cash prizes ranging from $250 to $2,500 for the top students and $5,000 to $25,000 for the top schools, plus one of the top five individual scorers (designated as Putnam Fellows) is awarded a scholarship of up to $12,000 plus tuition at Harvard University (Putnam Fellow Prize Fellowship), the top 100 individual scorers have their names mentioned in the American Mathematical Monthly (alphabetically ordered within rank), and the names and addresses of the top 500 contestants are mailed to all participating institutions. It is widely considered to be the most prestigious university-level mathematics competition in the world, and its difficulty is such that the median score is often zero (out of 120) despite being attempted by students specializing in mathematics.

The competition was founded in 1927 by Elizabeth Lowell Putnam in memory of her husband William Lowell Putnam, who was an advocate of intercollegiate intellectual competition.  The competition has been offered annually since 1938 and is administered by the Mathematical Association of America.

Competition layout 
The Putnam competition takes place on the first Saturday in December, and consists of two three-hour sittings separated by a lunch break. The competition is supervised by faculty members at the participating schools.  Each one consists of twelve challenging problems. The problems cover a range of advanced material in undergraduate mathematics, including concepts from group theory, set theory, graph  theory, lattice theory, and number theory. 

Each of the twelve questions is worth 10 points, and the most frequent scores above zero are 10 points for a complete solution, 9 points for a nearly complete solution, and 1 point for the beginnings of a solution. In earlier years, the twelve questions were worth one point each, with no partial credit given. The competition is considered to be very difficult: it is typically attempted by students specializing in mathematics, but the median score is usually zero or one point out of 120 possible, and there have been only five perfect scores . In 2003, of the 3,615 students competing, 1,024 (28%) scored 10 or more points, and 42 points was sufficient to make the top percentile.

At a participating college, any student who wishes to take part in the competition may (limited by the number of spots a school receives); but until 2019 the school's official team consisted of three individuals whom it designated in advance.  Until 2019, a team's score was the sum of the ranks of its three team members, with the lowest cumulative rank winning. It was entirely possible, even commonplace at some institutions, for the eventual results to show that the "wrong" team was picked—i.e. that some students not on the official team outscored an official team member. For example, in 2010, MIT had two of the top five scorers in the competition and seven of the top 24, while Caltech had just one student in the top five and only four in the top 24; yet Caltech took first place among teams while MIT took second. In 2019 the rules of the competition changed, with a school's team consisting of its top three scorers, and team ranks determined by comparing the sums of the scores of the team members.

Awards 
The top five teams win $25,000, $20,000, $15,000, $10,000, and $5,000, in that order, with team members receiving $1,000, $800, $600, $400, and $200, respectively.

The top five individual scorers are named Putnam Fellows and awarded $2,500. The school with the first-place team receives an award of $25,000. Each first-place team member, as well as the winner of the Elizabeth Lowell Putnam Prize, receives $1,000. Sixth through 15th place individuals receive $1,000 and the next ten receive $250. The names of the top 100 students are published in the American Mathematical Monthly, and competition results are published in early April of the year following the competition.

Many Putnam Fellows have gone on to become distinguished researchers in mathematics and other fields, including three Fields Medalists—John Milnor (also an Abel Prize laureate), David Mumford, and Daniel Quillen—and two Nobel laureates in physics—Richard Feynman and Kenneth Wilson.

Winners

Top-scoring teams

Teams ranked by historical performance

Below is a table of teams by the number of appearances in the top five and number of titles.

The following table lists Teams finishing in Top Five ( competition):

For a recent analysis, the following table lists teams that finished in the top five since 2000 ( competition):

The following table lists Teams with First place finishes ( competition):

Putnam Fellows
Since the first competition, the top five (or six, in case of a tie) scorers in the competition have been named Putnam Fellows. Within the top five, Putnam Fellows are not ranked.  Students are not allowed to participate in the Putnam Competition more than four times. For example, if a high school senior chooses to officially participate, he/she effectively chooses to forfeit one of his/her years of eligibility in college (see Gabriel Carroll). This makes it even more of a remarkable feat to become a Putnam Fellow four times. In the history of the Competition, only eight students have been Putnam Fellows four times, with twenty-three others winning the award three times. The following table lists these students:

The following table lists all Putnam fellows from 1938 to present, with the years they placed in the top five. Ioana Dumitriu was the first woman to become a Putnam Fellow, in 1996.

Elizabeth Lowell Putnam Award winners
Since 1992, the Elizabeth Lowell Putnam Award has been available to be awarded to a female participant with a high score, with three awards being made for the first time in 2019. The year(s) in which they were Fellows are in bold. Ioana Dumitriu was the first woman to become a Putnam Fellow, in 1996.

See also

 List of mathematics awards

References

External links

 William Lowell Putnam Mathematical Competition results
 William Lowell Putnam Competition problems, solutions, and results archive
 Archive of Problems 1938–2003
 Searchable data base for information about careers of Putnam Fellows
 A comprehensive history of the Putnam competition An electronic update of Gallian's 2004 paper (PDF)

Mathematics competitions
Recurring events established in 1927
Awards established in 1927
 
Awards of the Mathematical Association of America
1927 establishments in the United States